MMM Tamatave is a Malagasy football club based in Toamasina, Madagascar.

The team plays in the Malagasy Second Division.

In 1970 the team has won the THB Champions League.

Achievements
THB Champions League: 2
1970, 1980

Performance in CAF competitions
CAF Champions League: 2 appearances
1971 African Cup of Champions Clubs
1981 African Cup of Champions Clubs

References

External links

Football clubs in Madagascar